Richard Loqueville (died 1418) was a French composer active during the transition between Medieval and Renaissance music. A musician at Cambrai Cathedral, Loqueville was a harpist and teacher, whose students included Edward III, Duke of Bar and the influential composer Guillaume Du Fay.

Life and career
Little is known of Loqueville's life. A trained harpist, he taught it to Edward III, the son of the Robert, Duke of Bar, in 1410. He is also known to have taught plainsong to the Duke's choirboys. From 1413 until the end of his life he taught music at Cambrai Cathedral alongside Nicolas Malin. The celebrated composer Guillaume Du Fay was likely a student his student at the cathedral and Du Fay's first compositions were probably written under his influence and instruction. He is known to have been married. In 1418 he died in Cambrai.

Music
Attributed to him are four rondeaux, a ballade, an isorhythmic motet in honour of the Breton saint Yvo, a Marian motet, and several Mass movements.

Works

Editions
Loqueville's works are included in the following collections:

Notes

References

Sources
Books

 
 
 
 
 
 
 
 

Journals and articles

Further reading

External links
 
 Works by Richard Loqueville in the Medieval Music Database from La Trobe University

French composers
French male composers
1418 deaths
Year of birth unknown